The Skansen Tunnel may refer to:

 Skansen Tunnel (Trondheim)
 Skansen Tunnel (Bergen)